Cory Barlog (born September 2, 1975) is an American video game designer, director, and writer who is the current creative director of video game development at Santa Monica Studio. He is best known for his work on God of War (2005), God of War II (2007), and God of War (2018).

Early life
Barlog was born in Sacramento, California, on September 2, 1975, the son of fantasy novelist J. M. Barlog.

Career
In his early career, Barlog worked as a lead animator at Paradox Development on Backyard Wrestling: Don't Try This at Home and X-Men: Next Dimension. After joining Santa Monica Studio, he was the lead animator for God of War (2005) and directed God of War II (2007), for which he won a BAFTA for his writing work on the game. He also served as game director of God of War III (2010) for the first eight months of its development. Although not part of Sony at the time, he helped in writing God of War: Ghost of Sparta (2010).

Barlog was a keynote speaker at ECAROcon 2008, and later worked at LucasArts. In an interview, he announced that he was working on a tie-in video game for the 2015 film Mad Max: Fury Road. He was reported to be in Sweden to develop the title with Avalanche Studios, best known for Just Cause. Despite various gaming websites confirming that the game was in development over the coming years, Barlog had left Avalanche Studios early in its development and the game never materialized.

In March 2012, it was announced that Barlog had joined Crystal Dynamics to direct the cinematics for the new Tomb Raider game and direct an unannounced game. However, he left the company in April 2013.

In August 2013, it was announced that Barlog would return to Santa Monica Studio. He currently serves as the studio's creative director and directed God of War (2018). For the game, he won the Game Award for Best Game Direction, while the game itself won Game of the Year and the BAFTA Games Award for Best Game. He also wrote the foreword to the novelization of the game, which was written by his father. He also produced the sequel God of War Ragnarök (2022).

Games

References

External links
Cory Barlog blog
MobyGames profile
Cory Barlog interview with Mega 64

American video game designers
People from Sacramento, California
Place of birth missing (living people)
1975 births
Living people